Nettleton is an unincorporated community in Edwards County, Kansas, United States.

History
Nettleton once had a post office, but prior to February, 1878, this post office was called Fitchburgh. The post office in the town opened in 1877, closed in 1882, was re-established in 1903, closed again in 1904, opened again in 1912, and closed permanently in 1917.

References

Further reading

External links
 Edwards County maps: Current, Historic, KDOT

Unincorporated communities in Edwards County, Kansas
Unincorporated communities in Kansas